Paroi is a state constituency in Negeri Sembilan, Malaysia, that has been represented in the Negeri Sembilan State Legislative Assembly.

The state constituency was created in 2003. It was first contested in 2004 and is mandated to return a single Assemblyman to the Negeri Sembilan State Legislative Assembly under the first-past-the-post voting system. , the State Assemblyman for Paroi is Mohamad Taufek Abd Ghani from AMANAH, which is part of the state's ruling coalition, Pakatan Harapan (PH).

Definition 
The Paroi constituency contains the polling districts of Paroi, Taman Satria, Taman Tuanku Jaafar, Taman Sri Permata, Kombok, Taman Tasik Jaya, Bukit Seri Senawang, Taman Kobena, Senawang Jaya and Taman Marida.

Demographics

Representation history

Election results

References

Negeri Sembilan state constituencies